The 1945 Purdue Boilermakers football team was an American football team that represented Purdue University in the Big Ten Conference during the 1945 Big Ten Conference football season.  In their second season under head coach Cecil Isbell, the Boilermakers compiled a 7–3 record (3–3 against Big Ten opponents), finished in fifth place in the conference, and outscored opponents by a total of 198 to 125.

Three Purdue players received  honors from the Associated Press (AP) or United Press (UP) on the 1945 All-Big Ten Conference football team: Ed Cody at halfback (AP-1, UP-1); Tom Hughes at tackle (UP-1); and Bob DeMoss at halfback (UP-2). Cody ranked fifth nationally with 847 rushing yards, and DeMoss ranked sixth with 742 passing yards.

Schedule

Roster

Game summaries

Marquette
 David Shaw 15 rushes, 116 yards

Iowa
 Bill Canfield 13 rushes, 131 yards

Miami (OH)
 Bill Canfield 17 rushes, 123 yards

References

Purdue
Purdue Boilermakers football seasons
Purdue Boilermakers football